Caspiy was an airline in Kazakhstan.

Fleet 
The Caspiy fleet consisted of the following aircraft:

External links

Airlines of Kazakhstan
Airlines established in 2011